is the fifth studio album by Japanese entertainer Miho Nakayama. Released through King Records on July 15, 1987, the album features no singles, but was the first to feature Nakayama as a songwriter (under the pseudonym ). It was also her first album to be recorded outside Japan.

The album peaked at No. 3 on Oricon's albums chart and sold over 153,000 copies.

Track listing

Personnel
 Miho Nakayama – vocals
 George Rossi – percussion (A2)
 Augie Johnson – backing vocals
 Carmen – backing vocals
 James Studer – backing vocals

Charts

References

External links
 
 
 

1987 albums
Miho Nakayama albums
Japanese-language albums
King Records (Japan) albums